Novoraisk is a rural settlement (selyshche) in Ukraine, and the center of the Novoraisk rural hromada, in Beryslav Raion, Kherson Oblast.

The settlement came under attack by Russian forces during the Russian invasion of Ukraine in 2022.

Demographics 
According to the 2001 Ukrainian census, the settlement had 2376 inhabitants.

References

Villages in Beryslav Raion